After Casanova's Fashion (Italian: Casanova farebbe così!) is a 1942 Italian comedy film directed by Carlo Ludovico Bragaglia and starring Eduardo De Filippo, Peppino De Filippo, and Clelia Matania.

It was shot at the Cinecittà Studios in Rome. The film's sets were designed by the art directors Alfredo Montori and Mario Rappini.

Cast
 Eduardo De Filippo as Don Ferdinando  
 Peppino De Filippo as Don Agostino  
 Clelia Matania as Maria Grazia  
  as Ernestino  
 Nietta Zocchi as Donna Rosalia  
 Gildo Bocci as Pacchialone  
 Giovanni Conforti as Il maggiordomo 
 Ciro Berardi as Un cliente del barbiere 
 Roberto Bianchi Montero as Un giocatore di biliardo  
 Aristide Garbini as Il maresciallo  
 Nicola Maldacea as Il barbiere  
 Eduardo Passarelli as Un giocatore di biliardo  
 Mario Pucci 
 Alberto Sordi as Un giocatore di biliardo

References

Bibliography 
 Moliterno, Gino. The A to Z of Italian Cinema. Scarecrow Press, 2009.

External links 
 

1942 films
1942 comedy films
Italian comedy films
1940s Italian-language films
Films directed by Carlo Ludovico Bragaglia
Italian black-and-white films
Films shot at Cinecittà Studios
1940s Italian films